Gaiman may refer to:

People
 David Gaiman, former head of the UK branch of the Church of Scientology
 Neil Gaiman, author

Places
 Gaiman, Chubut, a town in Patagonia, Argentina

Other
 Gaiman Award, a Japanese award for comics created elsewhere

See also
 Gayman (disambiguation)
 Phil Gaimon, US cyclist